The men's 110 metres hurdles at the 1971 European Athletics Championships was held in Helsinki, Finland, at Helsinki Olympic Stadium on 13, 14, and 15 August 1971.

Medalists

Results

Final
15 August
Wind: -2.5 m/s

Semi-finals
14 August

Semi-final 1
Wind: -0.8 m/s

Semi-final 2
Wind: -2.5 m/s

Heats
13 August

Heat 1
Wind: -1.3 m/s

Heat 2
Wind: -0.7 m/s

Heat 3
Wind: -4.2 m/s

Heat 4
Wind: -2.1 m/s

Participation
According to an unofficial count, 24 athletes from 15 countries participated in the event.

 (1)
 (2)
 (1)
 (2)
 (1)
 (3)
 (2)
 (3)
 (1)
 (1)
 (1)
 (1)
 (2)
 (2)
 (1)

References

110 metres hurdles
Sprint hurdles at the European Athletics Championships